Ashley Spina (born 3 October 1992) is an Australian football (soccer) player, who last played for Brisbane Roar in the Australian W-League.

Personal life
Ashley is the sister of North Queensland Cowboys forward Ben Spina and daughter of North Queensland Cowboys first ever captain Laurie Spina.

References

1992 births
Living people
Australian women's soccer players
Brisbane Roar FC (A-League Women) players
Newcastle Jets FC (A-League Women) players
A-League Women players
Women's association football midfielders